The Munt la Schera Tunnel is a single lane road tunnel located in the Swiss canton of Graubünden. It connects the Engadin valley with Lago di Livigno, through Munt la Schera.

The tunnel was built to transport building materials for the construction of the Punt dal Gall dam. It was opened for public use in 1968, but is still owned and operated by the hydroelectric power company Engadiner Kraftwerke AG. The tunnel is only wide enough for a single vehicle so traffic moves in alternate directions, controlled by traffic lights which change every 15 minutes. (A different pattern of alternating traffic applies on Saturdays in winter.) From June to September, cyclists may take their cycles on a half-hourly shuttle bus, and at other times they may use a limited number of places on the public bus service.

As of May 2015, the standard daytime toll for a single car journey through the tunnel is CHF16/EUR15. Slightly higher tolls are charged at night.

References

External links
 

Toll tunnels in Europe
Road tunnels in Switzerland
Tunnels completed in 1968
Tunnels in the Alps
Zernez